The members of the 38th General Assembly of Newfoundland were elected in the Newfoundland general election held in June 1979. The general assembly sat from July 12, 1979, to March 15, 1982.

The Progressive Conservative Party led by Brian Peckford formed the government.

Leonard Simms served as speaker.

There were four sessions of the 38th General Assembly:

Gordon Arnaud Winter served as lieutenant governor of Newfoundland until 1981. William Anthony Paddon succeeded Winter as lieutenant governor.

Members of the Assembly 
The following members were elected to the assembly in 1979:

Notes:

By-elections 
By-elections were held to replace members for various reasons:

Notes:

References 

Terms of the General Assembly of Newfoundland and Labrador